Mount McGregor or variation, may refer to:

 Mount McGregor Correctional Facility, a former New York State prison
 Mount McGregor (mountain), a mountain in the town of Wilton, New York, USA
 McGregor Mountain (Washington), USA; a mountain 
 McGregor Mountain, (New York), USA; a mountain in Stamford, New York, USA

See also
 McGregor Plateau, Nechaka Plateau, Interior Plateau, British Columbia, Canada; a mountainous plateau
 McGregor Range, Central Interior, British Columbia, Canada; a mountain range
 McGregor (disambiguation)